Cautor is a genus of minute sea snails, marine gastropod mollusks or micromollusks in the family Triphoridae.

Species
Species within the genus Cautor are as follows:
 Cautor alveolata A. Adams & L. A. Reeve, 1850
 Cautor baculus 
 Cautor conferta C. F. Laseron, 1958
 Cautor cybaeus S. Kosuge, 1962
 Cautor hungerfordi G. B. Sowerby III, 1914
 Cautor intermissa
 Cautor lanceolata S. Kosuge, 1962
 Cautor levukensis R. B. Watson, 1881
 Cautor lutea Suter, 1908
 Cautor macmichaeli S. Kosuge, 1962
 Cautor maculosa Ch. Hedley, 1903
 Cautor marceda 
 Cautor marcedus C. F. Laseron, 1958
 Cautor minima W. H. Pease, 1871
 Cautor monacha Hervier, 1897
 Cautor obliqua W. L. May, 1915
 Cautor puniceus S. Kosuge, 1963
 Cautor similis W. H. Pease, 1871
 Cautor subfenestra S. Kosuge, 1962
 Cautor tubularis  
 Cautor verrucosa A. Adams & L. A. Reeve, 1850

References

 Powell A. W. B., New Zealand Mollusca, William Collins Publishers Ltd, Auckland, New Zealand 1979 
 ZipCodeZoo
 BioLib

Triphoridae
Taxa named by Harold John Finlay